The 2020–21 Russian Women's Handball Super League was the 28th season of Russian Women's Handball Super League, Russia's premier handball league. Rostov-Don are the defending club.

The Russian Handball Federation streams every match of the league on their website.

Format
The competition format for the 2019–20 season consists of a home-and-away double round-robin system. The first six teams qualifies for play-offs, while the last six plays placement round. The two highest-ranked teams of the play-offs, will qualify for the semifinals. The team's who ended up placing 7th and 8th place, will also qualified directly to the semifinals for the placement round.

Teams

The following 12 clubs compete in the Super League during the 2020–21 season.

Foreign players

Regular season
<onlyinclude>

Playoffs

Championship bracket

Seventh place bracket

References

External links
 Russian Handball Federaration 

Women's Handball Super League
2020–21 domestic handball leagues